Matheus Reis de Lima (born 18 February 1995), known as Matheus Reis, is a Brazilian professional footballer who plays as a left back or centre-back for Sporting CP.

Club career
Reis is a youth product of the Brazilian League, São Paulo, he joined at the age of 12.

On loan to Sorocaba
On 2 January 2014, he joined Sorocaba on a season long loan.

Back to São Paulo
He made his professional debut with São Paulo on 7 February 2015 in a 2–1 Série A loss to Athletico Paranaense.

On loan to Bahia
In 14 January 2017, he joined EC Bahia on a season long-loan. On 14 May, he made debut for the club in a 6–2 win over Athletico Paranaense.

On loan to Moreirense
On 1 January 2018, he joined Moreirense on a season long-loan.

Rio Ave
On 1 July 2018, he sold to Rio Ave on a undisclosed fee. A week later, he made his debut in a Europa League qualifying with a victory over Jagiellonia. In 22 September, he made first assist against Santa Clara.

He scored his first and only goal in January 2020. He was suspended for the 2020–21 season for refusing to play against Vitória.

On loan to Sporting
He joined Sporting on a season long-loan in 2 February 2021.

Sporting
On December March 2021, Sporting agree with Rio Ave to buy Reis. He was sold to Sporting in 1 July 2021 on a free transfer.

Career statistics

Honours
Sporting 
Primeira Liga: 2020–21
Supertaça Cândido de Oliveira: 2021
Individual
Primeira Liga Defender of the Month: February 2022
Primeira Liga Team of the Year: 2021–22

References

External links

1995 births
Living people
Association football midfielders
Brazilian footballers
Campeonato Brasileiro Série A players
Primeira Liga players
São Paulo FC players
Clube Atlético Sorocaba players
Esporte Clube Bahia players
Moreirense F.C. players
Rio Ave F.C. players
Sporting CP footballers
Brazilian expatriate footballers
Brazilian expatriate sportspeople in Portugal
Expatriate footballers in Portugal
People from São João da Boa Vista